The Main road 31 is a west–east direction Secondary class main road in the Danube–Tisza Interfluve (Alföld) region of Hungary that connects Budapest to the Main road 33 main roads, facilitating access from the capital city of Hungary to Füzesabony. The road is 126 km long.

The road, as well as all other main roads in Hungary, is managed and maintained by Magyar Közút, state owned company.

Sources

See also

 Roads in Hungary
 Transport in Hungary

External links

 Hungarian Public Road Non-Profit Ltd. (Magyar Közút Nonprofit Zrt.)
 National Infrastructure Developer Ltd.

Main roads in Hungary
Pest County
Transport in Jász-Nagykun-Szolnok County
Heves County